Small Soldiers is a 1998 American action comedy film directed by Joe Dante. It stars Kirsten Dunst and Gregory Smith, along with the voices of Frank Langella and Tommy Lee Jones. It depicts two factions of toys which turn sentient after being programmed with a military microprocessor, putting two families in danger when one faction ultimately turns lethal.

Released on July 10, 1998, in the United States, the film received mixed reviews and grossed $87.5 million on a $40 million budget. Small Soldiers marks the last on-screen film role of Phil Hartman, who was murdered two months before the film's American premiere, and is dedicated in his memory. It was also the final film role of Clint Walker.

Plot

When top defense contractor GloboTech Industries acquires the Heartland Toy Company, CEO Gil Mars commissions toy designers Larry Benson and Irwin Wayfair to develop toys capable of "playing back". Mars selects Larry's "Commando Elite" action figures for the project, with Irwin's "Gorgonites" — peaceful monsters intended to be educational toys — as their enemies. Facing a tight deadline, Larry unwittingly equips the toys with GloboTech's X1000 microprocessor.

Working at his family's toy store, teenager Alan Abernathy persuades delivery driver Joe to give him a shipment of the new GloboTech toys, activating Major Chip Hazard, head of the Commando Elite, and Archer, the Gorgonites' leader. Alan develops a crush on his neighbor Christy Fimple, and returns home to discover Archer in his backpack, realizing the toys are essentially self-aware and capable of learning. That night, Chip Hazard activates his comrades to attack the Gorgonites, and Alan finds the store in disarray and the new toys missing. Christy helps clean up, and Alan calls GloboTech's customer service line to file a complaint. Larry and Irwin hear his message, and discover the X1000 is a military-grade artificial intelligence chip, susceptible to EMPs.

Following Alan home, the Commando Elite interrogate Archer, but Alan intervenes and is wounded by Nick Nitro, whom he partially destroys in the garbage disposal. His parents hear the commotion, but refuse to believe his explanation about the toys. Alan and Archer find the Gorgonites hiding in the store's dumpster; unlike the militant Commando Elite, the Gorgonites were programmed with Irwin's original friendly and inquisitive personalities, and merely seek their home, which they believe to be in Yosemite National Park. Tapping the Abernathys' phone line, the Commando Elite learn of Alan's interest in Christy. Infiltrating her house, they capture her younger brother Timmy, sedate their parents, and use Nick Nitro's AI chip to transform Christy's "Gwendy" fashion dolls into reinforcements. Taking Christy hostage, they demand that Alan surrender the Gorgonites.

Alan and Archer sneak into the Fimples' house and rescue Christy. The Commando Elite pursue them with improvised vehicles built in the Fimples' garage, but are destroyed in a fiery crash; only Chip Hazard survives. At the Abernathys' house, Alan, Christy, and the Gorgonites try to convince their families of the truth about the toys, and Irwin and Larry arrive to talk to Alan about his voicemail. Chip Hazard arrives with a new army of Commando Elite and more improvised vehicles and weapons, having hijacked a recall shipment driven by Joe, and lays siege to the house, cutting off the electricity. When Irwin suggests an EMP, the group realizes they can overload the nearby power lines. Christy, Irwin, and Larry make their way to the Fimples' house to ensure a larger surge, and the Gorgonites emerge and fight back against the Commando Elite. Climbing the utility pole, Alan is attacked by Chip Hazard, who battles and defeats Archer, but Alan thrusts him into the power transformers as Larry and Irwin wedge open the breakers, triggering the EMP blast and destroying the toys.

In the morning, as the authorities clean up, Mars arrives by helicopter, paying off Joe and both families for the damage, and instructs Larry and Irwin to repurpose the Commando Elite for military use. Alan and Christy start a relationship, and he discovers the Gorgonites survived the EMP underneath the Fimples' satellite dish. Alan brings the Gorgonites to Yosemite, sharing a goodbye before sending them off in his father's toy boat to find their home.

Cast

 Kirsten Dunst as Christy Fimple
 Gregory Smith as Alan Abernathy
 Jay Mohr as Larry Benson
 Phil Hartman as Phil Fimple
 Kevin Dunn as Stuart Abernathy
 Denis Leary as Gil Mars
 Ann Magnuson as Irene Abernathy
 David Cross as Irwin Wayfair
 Wendy Schaal as Marion Fimple
 Jacob Smith as Timmy Fimple
 Alexandra Wilson as Ms. Kegel
 Dick Miller as Joe
 Robert Picardo as Ralph Quist
 Jonathan Bouck as Brad
 Belinda Balaski as Neighbor
 Rance Howard as Husband
 Jackie Joseph as Wife

Small Soldiers was Hartman's last on-screen role before his death and the film is dedicated to his memory.

Voice cast

Gorgonites
 Frank Langella as Archer
 Christopher Guest as Slamfist/Scratch-It
 Michael McKean as Insaniac/Troglokhan (later known as Freakenstein)
 Harry Shearer as Punch-It
 Jim Cummings as Ocula

Commando Elite
 Tommy Lee Jones as Chip Hazard
 George Kennedy as Brick Bazooka
 Jim Brown as Butch Meathook
 Ernest Borgnine as Kip Killigan
 Clint Walker as Nick Nitro
 Bruce Dern as Link Static

Others
 Sarah Michelle Gellar and Christina Ricci as Gwendy Dolls
Excluding Jones and Dern, the Commando Elite are voiced by cast members from the 1967 film The Dirty Dozen. Dern replaced The Dirty Dozen actor Richard Jaeckel, who died before shooting began. Excluding Langella and Cummings, the Gorgonites are voiced by cast members from the 1984 film This Is Spinal Tap. The film was the last role for Walker before his retirement from acting.

Production
On making the film, director Joe Dante recalled, "Originally I was told to make an edgy picture for teenagers, but when the sponsor tie-ins came in the new mandate was to soften it up as a kiddie movie. Too late, as it turned out, and there are elements of both approaches in there. Just before release it was purged of a lot of action and explosions." For the film's effects shots, Dante stated that the original idea was to use mostly puppetry, using puppets provided by Stan Winston. However, Dante said that while shooting, it was "simpler and cheaper" to use computer-generated imagery (CGI) after the scenes had been shot, so the film is "one-third puppetry and the rest CGI." Dante believes that the studio had hopes that Small Soldiers would be the start of a film series.

Reception
On Rotten Tomatoes, 48% of 46 surveyed critics gave the film a positive review; the average score is of 6.1/10. The critical consensus states, "Small Soldiers has plenty of visual razzle-dazzle, but the rote story proves disappointingly deficient in director Joe Dante's trademark anarchic spirit." Audiences polled by CinemaScore gave the film an average grade of "B+" on an A+ to F scale.

Siskel & Ebert gave it Two Thumbs Down. Roger Ebert gave the film 2.5 out of 4 stars, saying: "The toys are presented as individuals who can think for themselves, and there are believable heroes and villains among them. For smaller children, this could be a terrifying experience." Caroline Westbrook of Empire Magazine gave the film 3 out of 5 stars and said: "It's Gremlins with toy soldiers, except not quite as dark or funny."

The film grossed $55.2 million in the United States and Canada and $87.5 million worldwide.

Lawsuit
Filmmaker Gregory P. Grant filed suit against Steven Spielberg, DreamWorks and Universal Pictures for copying his film Ode to GI Joe, which played at film festivals and earned him a Student Academy Award.

In other media

Merchandise
A soundtrack containing classic rock blended with hip hop was released on July 7, 1998, by DreamWorks Records. It peaked at 103 on the Billboard 200. The film score was composed and conducted by veteran composer Jerry Goldsmith. In addition, a video game based on the film was developed by DreamWorks Interactive and released by Electronic Arts on September 30, 1998. Kenner Products (a subsidiary of Hasbro) produced a line of toys, which featured the Gorgonites and the Commando Elite. Burger King teamed up with the film to promote their new product, the Rodeo Burger. They created a line of kids' meal toys tied to the film. They were met with some controversy after the film received a PG-13 rating from the Motion Picture Association of America (MPAA). Burger King executives claimed this caught the company by surprise as they were led to believe the film would receive no higher than a PG rating. According to Joe Dante, the MPAA gave the film a PG-13 rating due to the scene in which the Commando Elite put drugs in Phil and Marion's drink. While the pamphlet accompanying the toys included the disclaimer "While toys are suitable for children of all ages, the movie Small Soldiers may contain material that is inappropriate for younger children," some restaurants accepted an exchange for Mr. Potato Head toys.

Video games
Four video games were released in 1998:

 Small Soldiers - PlayStation (Electronic Arts/ DreamWorks Interactive)
 Small Soldiers: Squad Commander - PC (Hasbro Interactive/ DreamWorks Interactive)
 Small Soldiers - Game Boy (THQ/ Tiertex Design Studios/ DreamWorks Interactive)
 Small Soldiers: Globotech Design Lab - PC (Hasbro Interactive)

Cancelled remake
A remake of Small Soldiers was in development by 20th Century Fox called Toymageddon. The script was purchased in January 2014, and director Justin Lin was set to produce the film. The story was described to be set in a "toy factory that begins to run amok." At that time it was not explicitly stated to be a remake of Small Soldiers.

Due to the acquisition of 21st Century Fox by Disney on March 20, 2019, Disney later in August cancelled the film along with over 200 other projects, which revealed the film was intended as a remake of Small Soldiers.

References

External links

 
 
 

1998 films
1998 action comedy films
1990s science fiction comedy films
1990s fantasy comedy films
Action figures
Amblin Entertainment films
American action comedy films
American science fiction comedy films
American fantasy comedy films
American science fantasy films
DreamWorks Pictures films
Films about toys
Puppet films
Films scored by Jerry Goldsmith
Films directed by Joe Dante
Films set in Ohio
Films shot in Ohio
Films with screenplays by Ted Elliott
Films with screenplays by Terry Rossio
Films about sentient toys
Universal Pictures films
American robot films
American satirical films
1990s English-language films
Sentient toys in fiction
1990s American films